Tell England is a 1931 British drama film directed by Anthony Asquith and Geoffrey Barkas and starring Fay Compton, Tony Bruce and Carl Harbord. It is based on the 1922 novel Tell England by Ernest Raymond which featured two young men joining the army, and taking part in the fighting at Gallipoli. Both directors had close memories of Gallipoli, as did Fay Compton's brother, Compton Mackenzie. Asquith's father H. H. Asquith had been Prime Minister at the time of the Gallipoli Landings, a fact which drew press attention to the film, while Barkas had personally fought at Suvla Bay in the Gallipoli campaign.

In the United States it was released under the alternative title The Battle of Gallipoli.

Production
The film had originally been intended to be made as a silent film, but was delayed. It was made at Welwyn Studios using the German Klangfilm process. Much of the film was shot on location in Malta, standing in for Gallipoli.

Cast
 Fay Compton as Mrs. Doe 
 Tony Bruce as Rupert Ray 
 Carl Harbord as Edgar Doe 
 Dennis Hoey as The Padre 
 C.M. Hallard as The Colonel 
 Gerald Rawlinson as Lt. Doon 
 Frederick Lloyd as Capt. Hardy 
 Sam Wilkinson as Private Booth 
 Wally Patch as Sergeant 
 Hubert Harben as Mr. Ray
 Ian Hamilton as himself

References

External links
Tell England at IMDB

1931 films
British war drama films
British historical drama films
1930s war drama films
1930s historical drama films
Films directed by Anthony Asquith
Films directed by Geoffrey Barkas
Films based on British novels
Films set in the 1910s
Films set in England
Films set in Turkey
British World War I films
Works by A. P. Herbert
British black-and-white films
Films about the Gallipoli campaign
1930s English-language films
1930s British films